Helen Smith may refer to:
Helen Smith (academic), scholar of English literature
Helen Smith (baseball) (1922–2019), All-American Girls Professional Baseball League player
Helen Smith (fencer) (born 1953), Australian Olympic fencer
Helen Smith (nurse) (1956–1979), died in suspicious circumstances in Saudi Arabia
Helen Smith (psychologist), American forensic psychologist
Helen Smith (politician) (1927–2007), New Zealand politician in the Values Party
Helen Smith (writer) (born 1968), English novelist and dramatist
Helen Douglas Smith (1886–1955), Canadian politician
Helen Fairchild Smith (died 1926), professor of English literature and Dean of Wells College
Helen Hay Smith (1873–1918), New Zealand clothing manufacturer and retailer
Helen Macpherson Smith (1874–1951), Australian philanthropist
Helen Sobel Smith (1909–1969), American bridge player
Helen Wong Smith (fl. 1980s–2010s), American archivist and librarian
 Helen Smith, a character in the television series Moonbase 3
Baby Bunny Smith (1888–1951), sideshow performer born as Helen Smith

See also 
Hélène Smith (1861–1929), French psychic
Ellen Smith (disambiguation)